Kim Gil-Sik (Hangul: 김길식; born 24 August 1978) is a South Korean former football player and coach.

Club career
He played for Chunnam Dragons, Bucheon SK / Jeju United, Daejeon Citizen, and Oțelul Galați in the Romanian Liga I in his professional career.

He was released from Daejeon Citizen on 6 March 2009.

At the end of 2008 season, Kim retired from professional football.

International career
He was par of the South Korea squad at the 2000 Summer Olympic as reserved player.

Managerial career
In 2012, Kim joined Jeonnam Dragons as a scout and coach. He moved to Gwangju FC the following year as a coach. After, he joined the Korean National Team as chief assistant coach of the U-17 and U-16 squad. In 2018, he was appointed manager of the Under-15 squad of the Korea national team.

On December 31, 2019, Kim was appointed as the manager of Ansan Greeners FC

Career statistics

References

External links
 
 
 

1978 births
Living people
Association football midfielders
South Korean footballers
South Korean expatriate footballers
Jeonnam Dragons players
Jeju United FC players
ASC Oțelul Galați players
Daejeon Hana Citizen FC players
Liga I players
Expatriate footballers in Romania
South Korean expatriate sportspeople in Romania
Footballers at the 2000 Summer Olympics
Olympic footballers of South Korea
Dankook University alumni